Anna Nagar is a neighbourhood in the city of Tiruchirappalli in Tamil Nadu, India. It adjoins the residential locality of Thillai Nagar.

Neighbourhoods and suburbs of Tiruchirappalli

Memorials to C. N. Annadurai